Acrolepia nitrodes is a moth of the family Acrolepiidae. It was described by Edward Meyrick in 1910. It is found in Bengal.

References

Moths described in 1910
Acrolepiidae